This list of parks in Indianapolis provides a general overview of parkland in Indianapolis, Indiana, organized by jurisdiction and size. Parks in the city are operated primarily by the City of Indianapolis Department of Parks and Recreation, also known as Indy Parks. In 2020, there were 212 city parks, four state-owned parks, and numerous privately-managed parks. In addition to the parks operated by Indy Parks, there are also independent non-profit parks, as well as parks operated by the state of Indiana and by the excluded cities of Beech Grove, Lawrence, Southport, and Speedway.

Municipal parks

Other facilities
Indy Parks operates several standalone recreational facilities, including Kuntz Memorial Soccer Stadium and the Major Taylor Velodrome.

Private parks
Not managed by any municipality, each of these parks is run by its own independent volunteer board of directors, and operates with fundraising and volunteer support.

State parks

Former parks

See also
List of attractions and events in Indianapolis

Notes

References

External links

Indy Parks and Recreation website

 
Parks
Indianapolis